Raivis Vidzis (born 22 March 1976) is a leading international strongman competitor, former two-time holder of the World Strongman Cup title and repeat entrant to the World's Strongest Man. Now retired from strongman, Raivis currently competes in Mixed Martial Arts.

Biography
Vidzis won his country's strongest man title when he was just 24 year's old. He went on to dominate in Latvia for four years whilst also making a reputation on the international circuit. In 2004 he won the overall title for the World Strongman Cup having thrown in his lot with them as opposed to the International Federation of Strength Athletes. He won it again in 2005, and made a number of appearances in the Strongman Super Series. He qualified for the prestigious 2005 World's Strongest Man competition but did not make the final. In 2006 he was invited to the 2006 World's Strongest Man where he made the final ten, finishing ninth overall. In 2007 a fourth place showing in Europe's Strongest Man was the highlight although he did make the 2007 World's Strongest Man competition but did not make the final. Vidzis, having been so active in the now defunct World Strongman Cup, reduced his competitive activity in 2008 and 2009. He competed in the 2008 World's Strongest Man competition but again did not make the final. An appearance at the 2009 Europe's Strongest Man was the only major engagement of that year.

Competition record
 2000
 1. – Latvia's Strongest Man
 2001
 1. – Latvia's Strongest Man
 7. – World's Strongest Team 2001 (with Raimonds Bergmanis)
 2002
 9. – Europe's Strongest Man 2002
 1. – Latvia's Strongest Man
 2003
 1. – Latvia's Strongest Man
 2004
 2. – World Strongman Cup 2004: Edmonton
 2005
 4. – Polish Giants, Łódź
 1. – World Strongman Cup 2005: Mińsk
 4. – World Strongman Cup 2005: Wexford
 4. – World Strongman Cup 2005: Yorkshire
 3. – World's Strongest Team 2005 (with Rolands Gulbis)
 1. – World Strongman Cup 2005: Denver
 5. – Strongman Super Series 2005: Malbork
 5. – Strongman Super Series 2005: Varberg
 4. – World Strongman Cup 2005: Bad Häring
 1. – World Strongman Cup 2005: Ladysmith
 5. – Europe's Strongest Man 2005
 5. – World Strongman Cup 2005: Nuremberg
 1. – World Strongman Cup 2005: Chanty-Mansyjsk
 2006
 5. – Polish Giants, Łódź
 2. – World Strongman Cup 2006: Ryga
 5. – World Strongman Cup 2006: Armagh
 8. – Strongman Super Series 2006: Milicz
 2. – World Strongman Cup 2006: Mińsk
 2. – Poland against Europe
 9. – 2006 World's Strongest Man, China
 10. – World Strongman Cup 2006: Vienna
 6. – World Strongman Cup 2006: Grodzisk Mazowiecki
 5. – World Strongman Cup 2006: Podolsk

 2007
 6. – Polish Giants, Łódź
 2. – World Strongman Cup 2007: Ryga
 4. – Europe's Strongest Man 2007
 6. – World Strongman Cup 2007: Dartford
 4. – Grand Prix of Khanty-Mansijsk (WSMC)
 2008
 7. – Europe's Strongest Man 2008
 3. – Polish Grand Prix
 8. – Strongman Super Series 2008: Lysekil
 2009
 8. – Europe's Strongest Man 2009

Mixed martial arts record

|-
|Win
|align=center|2–0
| Julius Zurauskis
|Submission (rear-naked choke)
|WFCA – Fight Arena: Latvia vs. Russia
|
|align=center|1
|align=center|1:56
|Riga, Latvia
|
|-
|Win
|align=center|1–0
| Vadim Gridiajev
|Submission (rear-naked choke)
|WFCA – Cage Fight Volume 1
|
|align=center|1
|align=center|1:22
|Riga, Latvia
|

References

External links 
 Raivis Vidzis – Official site

1976 births
Latvian male mixed martial artists
Latvian strength athletes
Living people
People from Ogre, Latvia
Super heavyweight mixed martial artists